The Dallas Black Hawks were a minor-league professional ice hockey team in Dallas, in the U.S. state of Texas. It was a member of the Central Hockey League and played home games at State Fair Coliseum.

Origins and relocation to Dallas

The Black Hawks team was originally based in St. Louis, Missouri, where it was known as the Braves from 1963 to 1967.

However, the expansion of the National Hockey League into St. Louis resulted in the relocation of the team to Dallas for the 1967–68 season. The Black Hawks remained in Dallas until ceasing operations following the 1981–82 CHL season. During that time, they won four Adams Cup championships.

While in St. Louis and Dallas, the team served as the primary minor league affiliate of the Chicago Black Hawks, using the same colors, uniform design and primary logo. The team continued working exclusively with the Chicago NHL franchise until 1976 when Chicago moved their prospects to Moncton, New Brunswick of the American Hockey League. From that time on, multiple NHL franchises supplied players to the Dallas organization.

The Black Hawks and the Fort Worth Wings/Texans had a legendary rivalry as they competed in the CHL, complete with bench clearing brawls and fights in the stands, including a legendary 10-cent beer night near-riot in Fort Worth in 1978. The Texans folded at the same time as Dallas, along with the Oklahoma City Stars, which precipitated the demise of the Central Hockey League two years later.

Post folding
After the Black Hawks folded, Dallas would not see another professional hockey club, until the Dallas Freeze was established following the revival of the Central Hockey League for the 1992–93 season. The Freeze, in turn, would be followed by the arrival of the NHL's Minnesota North Stars, which relocated and became the Dallas Stars in 1993. The Black Hawks' name and logo would later be revived in 2017, as local youth hockey organization HC Dallas announced that its highest-level teams would compete as Dallas Blackhawks Elite.

1967 establishments in Texas
1982 disestablishments in Texas
Central Professional Hockey League teams
Chicago Blackhawks minor league affiliates
Defunct Central Hockey League teams
Defunct ice hockey teams in Texas
Edmonton Oilers minor league affiliates
Ice hockey clubs disestablished in 1982
Ice hockey clubs established in 1967
Sports teams in Dallas
Vancouver Canucks minor league affiliates
Ice hockey in Texas